"Crank It Up" is a song by Ashley Tisdale from her second studio album, Guilty Pleasure. The song was released as the album's second single on October 9, 2009. The single had no official release in the United States and Canada. The song features uncredited vocals by David Jassy.

Song information

The song is included as a bonus track in the standard edition of "Guilty Pleasure". The single was released on October 16, 2009, in Germany and on October 17, 2009, in the rest of Europe. The song is included in the German compilation album Popstar Hits and she performed the song in several live shows such as Popstars.

Music video
The music video is directed by Scott Speer and was filmed on the week of September 28, 2009 in Los Angeles. The video begins with Tisdale in a black outfit with black wings on her back in a room. Before she sings, there is a metronome moving to the beat of the song and a turntable playing, it also shows her in the same black outfit while walking along a hallway and singing. Then towards the second verse, she is in a light yellow dress and is standing near a wall. Then at the second chorus, she is at a party singing and dancing next to a man. Towards the end of the song she is seen in her light yellow dress standing on a table with people sitting around it. Justin Baldoni and Wesley Quinn make cameos. The video premiered on VIVA Germany on October 5, 2009 and on Myspace on October 6, 2009. E! Entertainment said that "Tisdale wants to dance, and not in that G-rated, Disney-fied way, either, in this video. We see her practicing some sexy moves, seductive looks and various hand-to-hair gestures after watching. Fortunately, all that preparation eventually pays off, and she finally makes it onto the dance floor".

Track listing

CD Maxi Single
 "Crank It Up" (Single Version) – 3:01
 "Time's Up" (Non-album Track) – 3:25
 "Blame It on the Beat" (Non-album Track) – 3:28

International Digital Single
 "Crank It Up" (Single Version) – 3:01
 "Time's Up" (Non-album Track) – 3:28

Chart performance
The song has appeared in the Austrian for five consecutive weeks and in the German charts for nine non-consecutive weeks.

Credits and personnel

Song credits
 Vocals – Ashley Tisdale, David Jassy
 Producer – Twin and Alke
 Writer (s) – Niclas Molinder, Joacim Persson, Johan Alkenäs and David Jassy.
 Chorus – David Jassy
 Background vocals – Freja Jonsson-Blomberg
 Recording engineer – Brian Summer
 Mix engineer – Jonnie "Most" Davis
 Guitarist (s) – Joacim Persson and Johan Alkenäs

CD Single credits
 Executive producers – Lori Feldman and Tom Whalley
 A&R – Tommy Page
 Art Direction – Julian Peploe
 Management – Bill Perlman
 Photography – Roberto D'Este

Release details

References

2009 singles
2009 songs
Ashley Tisdale songs
Dance-pop songs
Music videos directed by Scott Speer
Song recordings produced by Twin (production team)
Songs written by David Jassy
Songs written by Joacim Persson
Songs written by Johan Alkenäs
Songs written by Niclas Molinder
Warner Records singles